Anthospermum is a genus of flowering plants in the family Rubiaceae. It is found in Tropical and Southern Africa, Madagascar and in southwestern Arabian Peninsula.

Species

 Anthospermum aethiopicum L.
 Anthospermum ammannioides S.Moore
 Anthospermum asperuloides Hook.f.
 Anthospermum basuticum Puff
 Anthospermum bergianum Cruse
 Anthospermum bicorne Puff
 Anthospermum comptonii Puff
 Anthospermum dregei Sond.
 Anthospermum emirnense Baker
 Anthospermum ericifolium (Licht. ex Roem. & Schult.) Kuntze
 Anthospermum esterhuysenianum Puff
 Anthospermum galioides Rchb. ex Spreng.
 Anthospermum galpinii Schltr.
 Anthospermum herbaceum L.f.
 Anthospermum hirtum Cruse
 Anthospermum hispidulum E.Mey. ex Sond.
 Anthospermum ibityense Puff
 Anthospermum isaloense Homolle ex Puff
 Anthospermum littoreum L.Bolus
 Anthospermum longisepalum Homolle ex Puff
 Anthospermum madagascariensis Homolle ex Puff
 Anthospermum monticola Puff
 Anthospermum pachyrrhizum Hiern
 Anthospermum palustre Homolle ex Puff
 Anthospermum paniculatum Cruse
 Anthospermum perrieri Homolle ex Puff
 Anthospermum prostratum Sond.
 Anthospermum rigidum Eckl. & Zeyh.
 Anthospermum rosmarinus K.Schum.
 Anthospermum spathulatum Spreng.
 Anthospermum streyi Puff
 Anthospermum ternatum Hiern
 Anthospermum thymoides Baker
  K.Schum.
 Anthospermum vallicola S.Moore
 Anthospermum villosicarpum (Verdc.) Puff
  Hiern
 Anthospermum whyteanum Hiern
 Anthospermum zimbabwense Puff

References

External links

Anthospermum in the World Checklist of Rubiaceae

Rubiaceae genera
Anthospermeae
Taxonomy articles created by Polbot